Manfred Bial (10 December 1869 – 26 May 1908) was a German physician who invented a test for pentoses using orcinol, now known as Bial's test.

Bial was born December 10, 1869 in Breslau, the son of Max Bial. He was an assistant at the Kaiserin-Augusta-Hospital in Berlin. Bial died May 26, 1908 in Monaco.

References

1869 births
1908 deaths
19th-century German physicians